Disa Lindberg (15 March 1910 – 2 September 1974) was a Finnish swimmer. She competed in the women's 400 metre freestyle event at the 1928 Summer Olympics.

References

External links
 

1910 births
1974 deaths
Olympic swimmers of Finland
Swimmers at the 1928 Summer Olympics
People from Kuopio
Finnish female freestyle swimmers
Sportspeople from North Savo